I Wish may refer to:

Film
 I Wish (film), a 2011 Japanese film by Hirokazu Kore-eda
 I Wish (Qimiao-de lucheng), 2007 Taiwan comedy with Charles 'Blackie' Chen Cheryl Yang

Music
 I Wish (band), a Japanese pop group
"I Want" song, a type of song popular in musical theatre

Albums
 I Wish (Sammy Adams album) (2012)
 I Wish (Skee-Lo album) (1995)
 I Wish (Deen album) (1996)

Songs
 "I Wish" (Gabrielle song)
 "I Wish" (Cher Lloyd song) (2013)
 "I Wish" (Joel Corry song) (2021)
 "I Wish" (Hayley Kiyoko song) (2019)
 "I Wish" (Jo Dee Messina song) (2003)
 "I Wish" (Mini Viva song) (2009)
 "I Wish" (Morning Musume song) (2000)
 "I Wish" (R. Kelly song) (2000)
 "I Wish" (Shanice song) (1994)
 "I Wish" (Skee-Lo song) (1995)
 "I Wish" (Carl Thomas song) (2000)
 "I Wish" (Stevie Wonder song) (1976)
 "I Wish", a 2006 song by Babyshambles from The Blinding EP
 "I Wish", a 1998 song by Graham Coxon from The Sky Is Too High
 "I Wish", a 2008 song by DMX
 "I Wish", a 2007 song by Hilary Duff from Dignity
 "I Wish", a 2011 song by Hot Chelle Rae from Whatever
 "I Wish", a 2003 song by Infected Mushroom from Converting Vegetarians
 "I Wish", a 1999 song by Ai Maeda for Digimon Adventure
 "I Wish", a 2011 song by One Direction from Up All Night
 "I Wish", a 2021 song by Joel Corry featuring Mabel